Grand Duke of Finland, alternatively the Grand Prince of Finland, was, from around 1580 to 1809, a title in use by most Swedish monarchs. Between 1809 and 1917, it was the official title of the ruler of the autonomous Grand Duchy of Finland, who was also the Emperor of Russia. The anachronistic female form of the title in English would be Grand Duchess of Finland. The only women to have used the title were the Swedish queens regnant Kristina and Ulrika Eleonora. A few crown princes of Sweden also were called Grand Duke of Finland.

Swedish era until 1809
Around 1580, King Johan III of Sweden, who had previously (1556–63) been the Duke of Finland (a royal duke), assumed the subsidiary title Grand Duke of Finland (to the titles of the King of Sweden, first appearing in sources in 1581 (though first used by Johan III in 1577). In those years, Johan was and had been in a quarrel with his eastern neighbour, Tsar Ivan IV of Russia ('Ivan the Terrible'), who had a long list of subsidiary titles as Grand Duke of several ancient Russian principalities and provinces. The use of Grand Duke on Johan's behalf was a countermeasure to signify his mighty position as sovereign of Sweden, also a multinational or multi-country realm, and equal to a Tsardom. Not only was Finland added, but Karelia, Ingria, and Livonia, all of which were along the Swedish-Russian border. It is said that the first use of the new title was in an occasion to contact Tsar Ivan.

During the next 140 years, the title was used by Johan's successors on the Swedish throne, with the exception of Carl IX, who listed Finns as one of the many nations over which he was the king during 1607–1611. As the title had only subsidiary nature without any concrete meaning, it was mainly used at very formal occasions along with a long list of additional royal titles. The last Swedish monarch to use the title was Queen Ulrika Eleonora, who abdicated in 1720. However, in 1802, King Gustav IV Adolf gave the title to his new-born son, Prince Carl Gustaf, who died three years later.

Russian era 1809–1917

During the Finnish War between Sweden and Russia, the four estates of occupied Finland were assembled at the Diet of Porvoo on 29 March 1809 to pledge allegiance to Emperor Alexander I of Russia, who had already earlier during the war adopted the title Grand Duke of Finland to his long list of titles. Following the Swedish defeat in the war and the signing of the Treaty of Fredrikshamn on 17 September 1809, Finland became in some aspects an autonomous Grand Duchy, as in an informal real union with the Russian Empire.

The Imperial Grand Duke of Finland ruled Finland through his Governor General and a national Senate appointed by him. Although no Grand Duke ever explicitly recognised Finland as a separate state in its own right, the country nevertheless enjoyed a high degree of autonomy, until its independence in 1917.

Grand Dukes

Independence since 1917
Finland was declared an independent nation state on 6 December 1917. After the Civil War in 1918, there was a brief attempt to make Finland a kingdom from 9 October to 14 December 1918.

In 1919, Finland was declared a republic. Since then, all titles of monarchs are obsolete in the country.

Status today
Today, there are no pretenders to the title of the Grand Duke of Finland and it remains fully unused.

See also

 Anjala conspiracy
 Dukes of Swedish Provinces
 Finnish Declaration of Independence
 Governor-General of Finland
 History of Finland
 List of Finnish monarchs
 Monarchy of Finland

References

Grand Duchy of Finland